Karine Charlebois (born August 18, 1974, in Sainte-Thérèse, Quebec) is a Canadian comic book and animation artist who worked on the Gargoyles comic and its spin-off, Badguys.

Career
Charlebois has degrees in Business Administration/Marketing from École des Hautes Études Commerciales and Arts & Communications from Collège André-Grasset and Collège Ahuntsic.  She began her career at Cinar working on storyboard corrections on Arthur, then moved on to CinéGroupe working first on storyboard corrections, then as a storyboard artist on Mega Babies and Sagwa, the Chinese Siamese Cat. 
While her storyboarding experience includes work on several video games published by Microïds, Post Mortem and Syberia II, most of her portfolio is in traditional animation such as Arthur and Martha Speaks.

After meeting Gargoyles creator Greg Weisman during the Gathering of the Gargoyles convention, she worked with Slave Labor Graphics as the lead artist in the Bad Guys comic, and as a pickup artist on issue #5 of the main Gargoyles comic.

References

External links
 

1974 births
Artists from Quebec
Canadian animators
Canadian comics artists
Canadian storyboard artists
Living people
People from Sainte-Thérèse, Quebec
Canadian women animators
Canadian female comics artists